Thomas Scavo  is a fictional character on the ABC television series Desperate Housewives, played by actor Doug Savant.
Tom was originally credited as a recurring role throughout Season 1, but became credited as a series regular in Season 2. Early storylines often revolved around Tom's position at an advertising firm, causing him to frequently travel, usually leaving Lynette alone to run the family. Starting in Season 3, Tom's storyline turned to a focus of him trying to find what was next for him, due to being tired of working in advertising. When he finally decides, he opens Scavo's Pizzeria, much to Lynette's dismay. After the five year jump, it becomes apparent that Tom is now experiencing a mid-life crisis, as he purchased and restored an early model convertible. After Lynette gives birth to Paige, it is discovered that Tom is experiencing Male Post-Partum Depression (to which Lynette laughs off, thinking of it as a ridiculous notion.) Tom separates from Lynette at the end of Season 7 and dates Jane for the greater part of Season 8, however, Tom and Lynette reunite at the end of the series.

Storylines

Past 
Thomas "Tom" Scavo was born in 1968. He is the eldest of three children (Tom, Theresa and Peter) born to Allison and Rodney Scavo. He had three relationships in his life: first was one-night-stand Nora Huntington in 1994, Annabel Foster in 1997, but he told her he is not a husband material when they worked together in Advertising and one-night-stand with Renee Perry, during the short time when breaking up of engagement with Lynette.

Lynette Lindquist and Tom met in the same company when they worked together in advertising. They got married in 1997 and one year later they moved to Fairview, 4355 Wisteria Lane.

Lynette had a very successful career, but she gave up all that to become a stay-at-home mother. Tom was a working dad, always away from home, supporting financially his family.

Lynette met Mary Alice Young, Bree Van de Kamp and Susan Mayer, shortly after she discovered she is pregnant with twins. They thought it is better to have Lynette as a friend, than enemy. She become a mother to four children with Tom: twins Preston and Porter born in 1998, Parker in 1998 and Penny in 2004. She met Gabrielle Solis in 2003 and after a difficult short period of accommodation, she also become her best friend.

Season 1
Tom is frequently out of town and seems completely oblivious to Lynette's problems. Tom has been keeping a secret from his wife that only his father, Rodney Scavo, knows about - his one-night-stand with Renee. Tom decides to become a house-husband after losing his promotion to Tim Douggan and subsequently quits his job. He seems to truly love Lynette, being prepared to discuss family matters with her if she feels that they need to.

Season 2
Midway through the second season, Tom returns to the workplace, sharing an employer with his wife for the second time. When Lynette's boss, Ed Ferrera (Currie Graham), asks Lynette to send instant messages to his wife to help him heat up his sex life, his wife finds out and threatens to leave him unless he fires the person who sent the IMs. Feeling he cannot fire Lynette, Ed tells his wife it was Tom, deciding to fire him instead, but Lynette warns him he will need reasonable cause. Much to Lynette's horror, Ed finds one when he discovers that Tom has been falsifying expense reports. When Ed confronts him, the conversation ends with Tom punching Ed in the face. As grounds for dismissal have been met, double grounds in fact, Tom is fired. Tom is found out to be meeting another woman after Lynette follows him to Atlantic City and sees them embracing.  Lynette later finds out that this woman is actually the mother of his daughter - which he did not known he has - born long before he married Lynette.

Season 3
It is later revealed that the woman is Nora Huntington (Kiersten Warren). They had a one-night stand years before he met Lynette. She claims she conceived his child, a daughter named Kayla (Rachel G. Fox), but never told him.

Tom later confesses to Lynette that he wants to open up a pizzeria. Nora, however, consistently undermines him behind his back and tries to get Lynette to tell him to drop the idea while planning to tell him that she'd support him. She wants him back, determined to make a proper family for Kayla, but Tom rejects her and tells Lynette, who warns Nora to keep her distance in future. Tom and Lynette plan to fight Nora for custody of Kayla but before they get to court, Nora confronts Lynette in the supermarket, moments before the supermarket is taken hostage by Carolyn Bigsby. When Lynette tells Carolyn that Nora made a move on Tom, Carolyn shoots and kills Nora. Lynette promises Nora that she'll take care of Kayla, just before she dies.

Tom opens his pizzeria and with Lynette's help, gets it ready for the grand opening, overcoming a few hitches along the way. He then tries organizing a surprise for their ninth wedding anniversary but it goes wrong, leaving Lynette out in the woods at night, and rushes to meet her. A little while later, Tom throws out his back while working, leaving him confined to bedrest. Lynette hires a new chef, Rick Coletti (Jason Gedrick) as well as Mrs. McCluskey to look after Tom and the children when she's at work. One night, Tom and the kids come to the pizzeria to surprise her, where Kayla sees chemistry between Lynette and Rick and tells Tom. So Tom suggests that he returns to work and they fire Rick, but Lynette is not keen. After Lynette and Rick are locked in the freezer during an armed robbery, they cuddle to keep warm, but Tom sees the CCTV tape of them eating dinner prior to the robbery. He confronts Rick, telling him that although his marriage to Lynette is shaky, it is rock solid and Rick would never break it up. Tom asks Rick to quit but he refuses, claiming Lynette "doesn't want him gone". Rick later tells Lynette about his lunch with Tom and his feelings for her, and tries to get her to admit her feelings for him, but Lynette refuses and fires him.

After finding out Tom was returning to work, Lynette sobs in her bathroom, obviously distraught. Lynette and Tom's marriage continues to decline and they don't speak for days. Trying to rebuild their marriage, Tom gets his old college friend/marriage counselor to speak to them without Lynette knowing, but she realizes and becomes even angrier about his 'ambush therapy'. With Tom's doctor informing him on his back recovery, Tom suggests to Lynette they either talk or have sex. Lynette agrees to sex, which quickly turns violent and Lynette falls off the bed, banging her head on the bedside table. She goes to the hospital to be treated, and Tom finds out Lynette fell for Rick and misses him. The doctor performs a CAT scan on Lynette and finds swollen lymph nodes and suggests they do a biopsy as it could be a sign of lymphoma (a form of cancer).

Season 4
In the third episode "The Game", Tom attends Susan's small games party. However, Lynette remains at home because she is sick, Lynette's mother Stella secretly gets marijuana from Andrew and bakes it in some brownies she makes for Lynette so that it would ease Lynette's pain. It works and Lynette attends Susan's party high, and she brings the drugged brownies with her for everyone else to have. Stella arrives over and tells Tom why no one can have a brownie. Tom hastily takes them off everyone's plate before they can eat them and ends up accidentally pushing Gabrielle into new resident Adam Mayfair, spilling wine on him and sparking a feud between Gabrielle and Adam's wife Katherine Mayfair. Tom later appears at the end of the episode when Lynette discovers the truth from him about what Stella did.

When a tornado hits Wisteria Lane,the Scavos take shelter in Mrs. McCluskey's basement with Ida Greenbberg. Tom and the children are left in the basement while Lynette and Mrs. McCluskey go out looking for Ida's cat. When Lynette and Mrs. McCluskey hid from the tornado in a bathtub, Tom gets knocked out with asthma from the cat. While the Scavos and Mrs. McCluskey survive the tornado, Ida is killed saving Tom and Lynette's kids.

Rick returns, announcing that he is opening a new restaurant near the Scavos' pizzeria. Tom lies to the police when they investigate vandalism happening at Rick's restaurant, but later admits to Lynette that he did vandalize Rick's restaurant out of jealousy. He comes under investigation again when a fire breaks out in Rick's restaurant. He's confronted by Lynette, to whom he swears he left the founders ball to listen to the game on the car radio, and again by Rick after he finds a matchbook from Scavo's. The incident breaks out into a fight, and Tom is brought in by the police and later released after Lynette lies to them to provide him an alibi.

Eventually, it is revealed that Porter and Preston are responsible for starting the fire at Rick's restaurant. Tom and Lynette are at a crossroads about how to handle the situation, with Tom thinking they should go to therapy; Lynette discovers the boys got the idea from Kayla, and she takes Kayla to therapy behind Tom's back. Tom's denial about the problems Kayla causes for Lynette leads to her lying to the therapist and getting Lynette arrested for child abuse. Eventually, Tom is forced to send Kayla away to live with her maternal grandparents after he finds out what she did and she threatens to continue causing problems if Lynette comes back.

In the season finale, Tom and Lynette help with catering Bob and Lee's wedding. Tom's advise to Lee about standing up for himself (for wanting the ice sculpture be castle rather than a cherub) escalated to Bob and Lee arguing then canceling the wedding. Lynette and Tom get the two in the same room and Tom tells them that if they cannot decide over small decisions that they might as well not marry at all; that they should ask themselves whether they love each other enough that no problem can possibly tear them apart. His speech gets Bob and Lee to reconcile and to reaffirm to Lynette that their marriage is stronger than she thought.

Season 5
In the first episode of season 5, Tom is going through a midlife crisis and he buys a Ford Mustang. He has difficulty disciplining his teenage sons as they treat him far more cool than Tom was used to when he was their age. Lynette uses that against him by tricking Tom into letting the twins borrow his Mustang for a dance. When they come back a half-hour late, Tom angrily grounds them. When they claim he's more worried about the car than them, he kicks a mirror off it but confesses to Lynette that it was already broken and he had ordered a replacement, impressing her.

In "Mirror, Mirror," flashbacks show that Tom was electrocuted in an accident and nearly died, which pushed him to enjoy life as much as he could. In the present, he tells Lynette his plan to sell the pizzeria, buy an RV and spend a year traveling the country with his family. Lynette is not happy about this, leading to tensions between them. When Tom contacts one of Porter's friends' mothers, realtor Anne Schilling, she finds him a rehearsal space for the garage band he and some of the other Wisteria Lane men have started. He spends a lot of time there, and Lynnette confronts him about him allegedly having an affair with Anne, who has 'dropped by' with some items for the rehearsal space, among them a futon. Tom denies it—then steps on a condom wrapper on the floor. He deduces that Porter is sleeping with some girl there—but when Lynette sees Anne leaving from the rehearsal space when Tom is there, she is led to believe Tom is cheating on her...until one episode later when they discover that it is actually Port who is sleeping with Anne.  After much deliberation, Lynette decides to pay Anne off, but this backfires when Porter disappears, claiming that he wants to be with her. In the last episode, it is revealed that the Scavos' Pizzeria has lost its business to low sales, and Tom is forced to throw a Going Out of Business sale to raise the money to repay his loans and pay Bree her money.

Tom sinks into some depression being out of work, with Lynette getting a new job working for Carlos Solis. In the fifth-season finale, he decides to go back to college as a Chinese language major. Thinking this is part of his middle-age syndrome, Lynette attempts to sabotage Tom by getting him drunk the night before his entrance exam. It's only afterward that Tom says he was taking Chinese in hopes of getting a new job in that market. Incredibly, Tom manages to score in the top five on the exam despite the hangover. However, his college plans are jarred when Lynette reveals she is 3.5 months pregnant with twins.

Season 6
Tom is excited about becoming a dad again but Lynette is not sure if she loves her unborn children. Tom reassures her that when she will hold them in her arms, she will love them with all her heart. These twins are Tom's sixth and seventh children, but Lynette loses one of them to a miscarriage when she pushes Celia Solis out of the way of a plane crash-landing on Wisteria Line. It is also revealed that Tom has been cheating on some of his college courses out of fear of failing them. He is eventually forced to drop out of college and take over Lynette's job working for Carlos while she is on maternity leave.

Season 7
Tom is diagnosed with postpartum depression. He is then prescribed marijuana as a cure for this which stuns Lynette. In the episode "Let Me Entertain You", Tom decides to hire his own mother as a nanny for the new baby.

After a big argument, Lynette fires her mother-in-law, but Tom overrules her. After Lynette and Allison's talk, Tom's mother shows symptoms of dementia to Penny, unknown to Lynette and Tom. Tom and Lynette finally discover Allison's dementia on Halloween, after she collapses outside the Solises' house after going out to buy more candy, despite Penny telling her they had plenty. Allison is later admitted to a nursing home and Tom and Lynette agree to visit her there. Tom is deeply upset by his mother's illness. In episode 9 Susan walks in on Tom and Lynette having sex on the nursery floor and is in awe at Tom's huge penis; she then confronts Lynette about why she has never mentioned it before.

A drunken Renee Perry eventually reveals to Susan she once slept with Tom, putting Susan in an uncomfortable situation. When Susan is injured in a riot, a guilty Renee tells Tom she should reveal the truth, but Tom insists she keep it quiet. Renee finally confesses to Lynette, revealing the affair took place when she and Tom were engaged but having one of their regular "break-ups." Lynette is naturally upset, but keeps it quiet and begins a series of pranks against Tom as payback. When Renee find out what Lynette is doing, she tells Tom about it. Tom confronts Lynette and tells that he wanted to tell her about Renee, but there was never a good time for that because he did not want to ruin the wonderful life they have together. Lynette then forgives Tom.

Tom finds himself getting a major promotion at a new company and enjoys the work. Lynette is concerned about his over-working but Tom tells her he feels more alive than ever.  When Tom attends a conference, Lynette is upset that she's kept from the business talks and forced to attend spas and other projects with the other wives. She goes so far as to steal an ID from a woman only to find out she's the keynote speaker for a lecture. Back home, Tom snaps at Lynette that after so many years supporting her, it hurts that she can't do the same for him. Renee tells Lynette that she has to choose between her own wants or being a good wife. Tom then hires the duo to decorate his office like a Donald Trump-style boss but Lynette thinks that it is not right for him and goes a different way. Renee overrules her to give Tom the office he wants and Lynette yells at Tom over how he's changing but he retorts that he has to be this way in order to succeed and Lynette needs to stop thinking of him the way he's been at home the last several years.

When Tom decides to book a luxurious holiday for the family and announces it, Lynette is annoyed at Tom for not consulting her first. The two then pitch to the kids what they think is the best holiday which leads to yet another fight between them; this time however they insult each other, leaving them to decide that it is only them who need to spend a holiday together. The holiday turns out badly and the relationship deteriorates and becomes extremely awkward. When they return home Tom leads Lynette to believe that he will be spending some time in an apartment near the office. Before Lynette attends a street dinner party, Penny reveals to her that Tom had left her a note. Lynette is surprised and finds that Tom's unpacked suitcase from the holiday is not in the bedroom, convincing her that Tom had left her. After revealing to Susan her suspicions, Lynette walks into her house, finding Tom chopping up salad ingredients. He tells Lynette that he had only gone to the store. Lynette questions him why it had taken him two hours, leading Tom to reveal that he had left but came back when he considered that Lynette would have to lie about where Tom was to her friends at the dinner party. The two talk for a while and Lynette confesses that when she thought Tom had left, she felt relieved, leading the pair to finally decide to separate.

Season 8
By the beginning of season 8, Tom has moved off Wisteria Lane. He and Lynette agree to work on their marriage by attending couples counseling, however when Tom begins dating a woman from his new building, Jane, Lynette seems to think there is no point anymore in continuing counseling if Tom doesn't still have faith in their marriage. Later on he and Jane plan to go on a trip to Paris, although Lynette stops him at the airport and confesses to him that she is involved in the murder of Gabrielle's stepfather. He then agrees to stay with her to help her cope, and Jane is left to go to Paris without him. In "With So Little to Be Sure Of", Lynette and Tom sign their divorce papers, but the document do not make it to court. Tom later breaks up with Jane due to his feelings for Lynette. The married couple reconcile in the final episode, and Tom and Lynette move to New York City so Lynette can pursue her new career for Katherine Mayfair. The couple later buys a penthouse looking over Central Park, and took care of their six grandchildren in Central Park.

Notes

References

Desperate Housewives characters
Fictional businesspeople
Television characters introduced in 2004